Lithium bromide (LiBr) is a chemical compound of lithium and bromine. Its extreme hygroscopic character makes LiBr useful as a desiccant in certain air conditioning systems.

Production and properties

LiBr is prepared by treating an aqueous suspension of lithium carbonate with hydrobromic acid or by reacting lithium hydroxide with bromine. It forms several crystalline hydrates, unlike the other alkali metal bromides. 

Lithium hydroxide and hydrobromic acid (aqueous solution of hydrogen bromide) will precipitate lithium bromide in the presence of water.

LiOH + HBr → LiBr + H2O

Uses
A 50–60% aqueous solution of lithium bromide is used in air-conditioning systems as desiccant. It is also used in absorption chilling along with water (see absorption refrigerator). Solid LiBr is a useful reagent in organic synthesis. It is included into oxidation and hydroformylation catalysts; it is also used for deprotonation and dehydration of organic compounds containing acidic protons, and for the purification of steroids and prostaglandins.

Medical applications
Lithium bromide was used as a sedative beginning in the early 1900s, but it fell into disfavor in the 1940s as newer sedatives became available and when some heart patients died after using the salt substitute lithium chloride. Like lithium carbonate and lithium chloride, it was used as treatment for bipolar disorder.

Hazards
Lithium salts are psychoactive and somewhat corrosive. Heat is quickly generated when lithium bromide is dissolved into water because it has a negative enthalpy of solution.

References

Cited sources

External links

 

Bromides
Lithium salts
Metal halides
Mood stabilizers
Sedatives
GABAA receptor positive allosteric modulators
Alkali metal bromides
Rock salt crystal structure